John David Easton (March 4, 1933 – July 28, 2001) was an American professional baseball player. Easton went hitless in three at bats and failed to score a run as a baserunner.

Easton graduated from Trenton Central High School and was a member of Princeton's Class of 1955. He also played varsity basketball for the Tigers and captained their baseball team.

Easton made his MLB debut only days after signing his first pro contract, pinch running for veteran catcher Andy Seminick in the second inning of the first game of a doubleheader, against the Chicago Cubs, at Wrigley Field. Easton was not able to advance from second base when the Phils' rally was snuffed out by an inning-ending double play. However, Marv Blaylock, who had replaced Easton in the lineup, would score the only run of the game, thirteen innings later, as the Phillies won, 1–0.

That earned him a second stint with the Phillies, to start the 1959 campaign, but in three pinch hitting appearances, Easton struck out all three times. He was sent back to the minor leagues, and retired after the 1959 season.

Easton graduated with a degree in electrical engineering from Princeton and became a manager for Public Service Electric & Gas Company (P S E & G) (a public utility), retiring in 1995. A resident of Hopewell Township, Mercer County, New Jersey, he died at age 68 after battling melanoma on July 28, 2001.

References

External links

1933 births
2001 deaths
American men's basketball players
Baseball players from Trenton, New Jersey
Buffalo Bisons (minor league) players
Deaths from cancer in New Jersey
Deaths from melanoma
People from Hopewell Township, Mercer County, New Jersey
Philadelphia Phillies players
Princeton Tigers baseball players
Princeton Tigers men's basketball players
Princeton University School of Engineering and Applied Science alumni
Schenectady Blue Jays players
Trenton Central High School alumni
Williamsport Grays players